Elst is a village belonging to the municipality of Brakel. It is located in the Denderstreek in the province East Flanders in Belgium.

Overview
The village was mentioned in 977 as Elsuth. There are two mills in the village. The current mill was reconstructed in 1571. In 1859, it was severely damaged in a storm. In 1974, it stopped operations, and was declared a monument the next year.

The Leberg is located in the village. It is a steep 99 metre hill, and has become known as a significant obstacle in the Tour of Flanders.

Elst is known for its Geutelingen, a kind of pancake.

Gallery

References

External links 
 
 Toerisme Brakel - Local tourist service

Brakel
Populated places in East Flanders